Jenifer Mary Curnow (née Tole; 2 October 1931 - 21 January 2013) was a New Zealand librarian and writer.

Early life 
Curnow was the only daughter of Auckland architect George Tole and his wife Janet Tole (née Clarkson). She grew up in Auckland and attended Baradene College and the University of Auckland. She trained as a high school teacher and taught at various schools including Baradene College, Tamaki College and Westlake Girls High School.

Writing career 
In the 1970s Curnow began studying Māori-language manuscripts. She translated much of the written work of Māori scholar and historian Wiremu Maihi Te Rangikaheke, who had been George Grey's informant in his studies of Māori tradition and legend.

Publications 
 Curnow J. Hopa N. K. & McRae J. (2002). Rere atu taku manu! : discovering history language and politics in the Māori-language newspapers. Auckland University Press.
 Curnow J. Hopa N. K. & McRae J. (2006). He pitopito korero no te perehi maori : readings from the Māori-language press. Auckland University Press.

Personal life 
Curnow married poet Allen Curnow in 1965. The couple had 12 sons.

References

20th-century New Zealand women writers
1931 births
2013 deaths
University of Auckland alumni
People educated at Baradene College of the Sacred Heart
20th-century New Zealand writers
Place of birth missing
Place of death missing
New Zealand librarians
Women librarians
New Zealand translators